The Drover’s Wife is a play by Leah Purcell, loosely based on the classic short story of the same name by Henry Lawson published in 1892.

Synopsis 
The title character, Molly Johnson, is a heavily pregnant woman living in a remote homestead in the Snowy Mountains, whose husband spends long periods away as a drover. She encounters Yadaka, an Aboriginal man on the run from colonial authorities. Over a few days, a series of events occur which change their lives forever.

Productions 
The play premiered at the Belvoir St Theatre in Sydney from 17 September to 16 October 2016, directed by Leticia Càceres and produced by Belvoir. The cast included Purcell in the title role, Mark Coles Smith, Tony Cogin, Benedict Hardie, and Will McDonald.

Critical reception 
The play and the original production were widely acclaimed.

Awards
The Drover's Wife has received multiple awards, including the Nick Enright Prize for Playwriting and the overall Book of the Year at the NSW Premier's Literary Awards, and the Prize for Drama and the overall Victorian Prize for Literature at the Victorian Premier's Literary Awards. The play was named Best New Australian Work, and the Belvoir production Best Mainstage Production, at the Sydney Theatre Awards in January 2017. It received the national Helpmann Award for Best Play and Best New Australian Work in July 2017. At the AWGIE Awards in August 2017, The Drover's Wife received the Major Award across all writing for performance genres, the Stage award and the David Williamson Prize for excellence in writing for Australian theatre.

Film adaptation 
The play was adapted into a 2021 film, also written and directed by Purcell.

See also
Leah Purcell#The Drover's Wife

References

Further reading

Australian plays
2016 plays
Indigenous Australian theatre